Nababpur  is a census town in Chanditala I CD Block in Srirampore subdivision of Hooghly district in the state of West Bengal, India.

Geography

Location

Gangadharpur, Manirampur, Masat, Jangalpara, Dudhkalmi, Nawabpur, Bhagabatipur, Kumirmora and Ramanathpur form a cluster of census towns in Chanditala I CD Block.

Urbanisation
Srirampore subdivision is the most urbanized of the subdivisions in Hooghly district. 73.13% of the population in the subdivision is urban and 26.88% is rural. The subdivision has 6 municipalities and 34 census towns. The municipalities are: Uttarpara Kotrung Municipality, Konnagar Municipality, Serampore Municipality, Baidyabati Municipality, Rishra Municipality and Dankuni Municipality. Amongst the CD Blocks in the subdivision, Uttarapara Serampore (census towns shown in a separate map) had 76% urban population, Chanditala I 42%, Chanditala II 69% and Jangipara 7% (census towns shown in the map above). All places marked in the map are linked in the larger full screen map.

Gram panchayat
Villages and census towns in Nababpur gram panchayat are: Alipur, Dudhkalmi, Nababpur and Pakur.

Demographics
As per 2011 Census of India, Nababpur had a total population of 12,728 of which 6,309 (50%) were males and 6,419 (50%) were females. Population below 6 years was 1,696. The total number of literates in Nababpur was 9,594 (86.97% of the population over 6 years).

Transport
Janai Road railway station on Howrah-Bardhaman chord line is the nearest railway station.

References

Census towns in Chanditala I CD Block